The Baezaeko River  is a tributary of the West Road River, one of the main tributaries of the Fraser River, in the Canadian province of British Columbia. It flows through the Fraser Plateau to the West Road River.

The Baezaeko River's name is derived from a Dakelh word besikoh meaning "basalt river", referring specifically to the black basalt from which arrowheads were made. Another meaning is ″where there is obsidian in the river″.

Course
The Baezaeko River originates in and flows through the Fraser Plateau. From its source it flows generally east, then northeast and north. It flows through three Nazko First Nation Indian reserves: Baezaeko River Indian Reserves 25, 26, and 27.
 The Coglistiko River joins the Baezaeko from the west.

See also
 List of tributaries of the Fraser River

References

Central Interior of British Columbia
Rivers of British Columbia
Tributaries of the Fraser River
Cariboo Land District